James Brown Sings Raw Soul is the fifteenth studio album by American musician James Brown. The album was released in March 1967, by King Records.

Track listing

References

1967 albums
James Brown albums
Albums produced by James Brown
King Records (United States) albums